Chippewa County is a county in the eastern Upper Peninsula of the U.S. state of Michigan. As of the 2020 Census, the population was 36,785. The county seat is Sault Ste. Marie. The county is named for the Ojibwe (Chippewa) people, and was set off and organized in 1826. Chippewa County comprises the Sault Ste. Marie, MI micropolitan statistical area.

Chippewa County is one of Michigan's largest by area, and features shorelines on both Lake Huron and Lake Superior. It's irregular shape follows the Canadian border, itself following the St. Marys River. Drummond Island is part of Chippewa County.

Geography
It is the second-largest county in Michigan by land area and fifth-largest by total area.

The Michigan Meridian runs through the eastern portion of the county. South of Nine Mile Road, M-129 (Meridian Road) overlays the meridian. In Sault Ste. Marie, Meridian Street north of 12th Avenue overlays the meridian.

Adjacent counties & districts 
By land
 Mackinac County (south)
 Luce County (west)
By water

 Presque Isle County (south)
 Algoma District, Ontario, Canada (north)
 Manitoulin District, Ontario, Canada (east)

National protected areas
 Harbor Island National Wildlife Refuge
 Hiawatha National Forest (part)
 Whitefish Point Unit of the Seney National Wildlife Refuge

Game areas
The Munuscong Bay is open for hunting, boating and bird watching. The area is known for its duck hunting, including mallards, divers and green-winged teal ducks. The Bay is most known for its icefishing and duck hunting. During opening weekend of duck season (late September), hundreds of hunters come from all over the state to begin their season on the Bay.
This area has many types of waterfowl pass through it on their annual migrations.

Transportation

Major highways
All Interstate and US Highways in Michigan are all state-maintained highways and part of the Michigan State Trunkline Highway System.
  is Michigan's longest state highway overall; it ends on the Sault Ste. Marie International Bridge at the Canada border.
  travels from I-75 into downtown Sault Ste. Marie, and ends at the ferry to Sugar Island. 
Marie.
  is a highway that goes through Pickford and Rudyard, and ends at exit 373 on I-75.
  is a highway that begins at exit 378 on I-75, goes through the former base in Kincheloe, and terminates at M-129.
  is a highway that is the main connector from Tahquamenon Falls to M-28.
  (also known as Meridian Road) runs through the eastern part of the county, and ends at BS I-75 just south of Sault Ste. Marie.
  is a highway that goes to and terminates on Drummond Island.
  is the shortest highway in Chippewa County, just going through Brimley and ending at M-28.

County-designated highways
The following highways are maintained by the Chippewa County Road Commission as part of the county road system. They are assigned numbers by the Michigan Department of Transportation as part of the County-Designated Highway System.
 
  runs via Mackinac Trail, the former route of US 2 before it was replaced by I-75 in 1962.
 (Whitefish Bay National Forest Scenic Byway), is a National Forest Scenic Byway with the US Forest Service the Chippewa County Road Commission jointly maintains.

Airports
 Chippewa County International Airport (CIU) serves Chippewa county and the surrounding communities, providing commercial connection to hub airports.
 Drummond Island Airport (DRM) is a public-owned, public-use general-aviation airport with 2 runways (1 hard-surfaced).

The Michigan Aerospace Manufacturers Association announced that Chippewa County will house its new command and control center.  In last year, this is the third major announcement from the organization  guiding Michigan's aerospace and defense manufacturing community within the global industry.  Previously, MAMA announced plans for a Oscoda, Michigan Wurtsmith Airport horizontal launch site at and a Marquette, Michigan vertical launch site.

Demographics

The 2010 United States Census indicates Chippewa County had a population of 38,520. This decrease of 23 people from the 2000 United States Census represents a -0.1% change in population. In 2010 there were 14,329 households and 9,106 families in the county. The population density was 24.7 per square mile (9.5 square kilometers). There were 21,253 housing units at an average density of 13.6 per square mile (5.3 square kilometers). 72.3% of the population were White, 15.8% Native American, 6.5% Black or African American, 0.6% Asian, 0.1% Pacific Islander, 0.2% of some other race and 4.6% of two or more races. 1.2% were Hispanic or Latino (of any race). 17.0% were of German, 11.8% English, 12.2% Irish, 8.8% French, 6.4% Polish ancestry.

There were 14,329 households, out of which 28.2% had children under the age of 18 living with them, 47.5% were husband and wife families, 10.9% had a female householder with no husband present, 36.5% were non-families, and 29.5% were made up of individuals. The average household size was 2.34 and the average family size was 2.88.

The county population contained 20.1% under age of 18, 11.0% from 18 to 24, 26.5% from 25 to 44, 27.7% from 45 to 64, and 14.6% who were 65 years of age or older. The median age was 40 years. The population was 55.1% male and 44.9% female.

The 2010 American Community Survey 3-year estimate indicates the median income for a household in the county was $39,351 and the median income for a family was $54,625. Males had a median income of $25,760 versus $16,782 for females. The per capita income for the county was $19,334. About 2.3% of families and 18.6% of the population were below the poverty line, including 26.0% of those under the age 18 and 10.0% of those age 65 or over.

Government
Chippewa County voters have been reliably Republican from the start. Since 1876, they have selected the Republican Party nominee in 86% of national elections (31 of 36).

The county government operates the jail, maintains rural roads, operates the major local courts, records deeds, mortgages, and vital records, administers public health regulations, and participates with the state in the provision of social services. The county board of commissioners controls the budget and has limited authority to make laws or ordinances. In Michigan, most local government functions — police and fire, building and zoning, tax assessment, street maintenance, etc. — are the responsibility of individual cities and townships.

Elected officials

 Prosecuting Attorney: Robert L. Stratton
 Sheriff: Michael Bitnar
 County Clerk: Cathy Maleport
 County Treasurer: Carmen Fazzari
 Register of Deeds: Sharon H. Kennedy
 Drain Commissioner: James Zimmerman 
 County Surveyor: Robert Laitinen 

(Current as of October 2018)

Communities

City
 Sault Ste. Marie (county seat)

Village
 DeTour Village

Charter township
 Kinross Charter Township

Civil townships

 Bay Mills Township
 Bruce Township
 Chippewa Township
 Dafter Township
 Detour Township
 Drummond Township
 Hulbert Township
 Pickford Township
 Raber Township
 Rudyard Township
 Soo Township
 Sugar Island Township
 Superior Township
 Trout Lake Township
 Whitefish Township

Unincorporated communities

 Barbeau
 Bay Mills
 Bay Mills Indian Community (Indian Reservation)
 Brimley (named Superior until 1896)
 Dafter (named Stevensburg until 1893)
 Drummond
 Eckerman
 Emerson
 Goetzville (named Gatesville until 1917)
 Homestead
 Johnswood
 Hulbert
 Kelden (also spelled Keldon)
 Kincheloe
 Kinross
 Mission
 Neebish Island
 Paradise
 Pickford
 Raber
 Raco
 Rudyard (named Pine River until 1890)
 Shelldrake (Ghost town)
 Stalwart
 Stirlingville (named Jolly's Landing until 1888)
 Strongs
 Trout Lake
 Whitefish Point
 Vermilion

Indian reservations
 The Bay Mills Indian Community occupies a portion of land within Bay Mills Township and Superior Township, within another smaller portion within Sugar Island Township.
 The Sault Tribe of Chippewa Indians occupies scattered pieces of land within Kinross Charter Township, Sugar Island Township, and in the city limits of Sault Ste. Marie.

See also
 Delirium Wilderness
 List of Michigan State Historic Sites in Chippewa County, Michigan
 National Register of Historic Places listings in Chippewa County, Michigan

References

External links
 Chippewa County Government
 Chippewa County Profile, Sam M Cohodas Regional Economist, Tawni Hunt Ferrarini, Ph.D.
 

 
Michigan counties
1826 establishments in Michigan Territory
Populated places established in 1826